Paulo Sérgio da Silva, known as Paulo Sérgio (born 2 December 1972) is a former Brazilian football player.

Club career
He played 5 seasons and 90 games in the Primeira Liga for Marítimo, Nacional and Belenenses.

External links
 

1972 births
Sportspeople from Paraná (state)
Living people
Brazilian footballers
Coritiba Foot Ball Club players
C.S. Marítimo players
Brazilian expatriate footballers
Expatriate footballers in Portugal
Primeira Liga players
C.D. Nacional players
C.F. Os Belenenses players
S.C. Olhanense players
Liga Portugal 2 players
Association football midfielders
Association football defenders